Chandani Seneviratne, (born 28 December 1962), is an actress in Sri Lankan cinema, theatre and television. One of the most distinguished artists in Sinhala cinema, Seneviratne has received critical acclaim and awards at every award festival in Sri Lanka for several dramatic roles.

Early days
Seneviratne studied at Dharmapala Vidyalaya, Pannipitiya till grade 5 and St. Paul's Girls School, Milagiriya till her high studies. She started her acting career as a Theatre Artist and made her film debut in Sathi Puja in 1985, for which she won the Presidential Award for best supporting Actress.

Awards
She is the recipient of a Dubai International Film Award, a Presidential Award, a Sarasaviya Award, a Lanka Live Award and a Hiru Golden Film Award.

Filmography
 No. denotes the Number of Sri Lankan film in the Sri Lankan cinema.

Television Serials

 Adaraneeya Amma 
 Akala Sandya
 Ammai Thaththai
 Appachchi
 අමා Arungal 
 Bandara Deiyo Bedde Kulawamiya Bonikko 
 Bumuthurunu Chess Dekona Gini 
 Deiyo Sakki Doo Daruwo Dumriya Andaraya 
 Gamperaliya Gangulen Egodata Giraya හෘද සාක්ෂිය
 Hiru Kumari
 Ilandari Hendewa
 Imadiya Mankada
 Jeewithaya Dakinna 
 Jeewithayata Idadenna 
 Kaala Nadee Gala Basi 
 Karuwala Gedara 
 Kasthirama
 Kinihiraka Pipi Mal 
 Madol Doowa
 Maha Polowa
 Mayim Neyo 
 Nannadunanni
 Nedeyo
 Nil Ahasa Oba
 Niranandaya
 Nisala Wila
 Oba Kawda
 One Way
 Piyasa
 Pithru
 Punchi Rala 
 Rala Bindena Thena 
 Ramya Suramya
 Sadgunakaraya 
 Sahodaraya
 Sanda Duranan
 Sankranthi Samaya
 Sathpura Wesiyo
 Senakeliyai Maya
 Sihina Danauwa
 Sikuru Udanaya 
 Siththara Gurunnanse
 Smarana Samapthi
 Sudo Sudu
 Sudu Andagena Kalu Awidin
 Sulanga Matha Mohothak
 Thaksalawa
 Thara
 Tharu Walalla
 Theth Saha Viyali 
 Vinivindimi
 Weda Hamine
 Weeraya Gedara Ewith
 Yakada Pahan Thira

Awards and honors

Films

Dubai International Film Festival - Jury's Special Mention of the Best Actress Award - Nikini Wessa (2012)
Presidential Award for the Best Supporting Actress - Sathi Puja (1984)
Sarasaviya Award for the Best Actress - Udu Gan Yamaya (2006)
SIGNIS Gold award for Creative Acting (Female) - Udu Gan Yamaya (2006)
Presidential Award for the Best Supporting Actress - Sulanga (2006) 
SIGNIS Special Merit Award - Sulanga (2006)
Sarasaviya Award for the Best Supporting Actress - Uppalawanna (2007)
Lanka Live Award for Best Actress - Nikini Wessa (2012)
Hiru Golden Film Award for Best Actress - Nikini Wessa (2012)
SIGNIS Award for Creative Performance (Female): Silver Award - Nikini Wassa (2012)
SIGNIS Award for Most Creative Supporting Actress - Kusa Paba (2013)

Tele Dramas

Raigam Tele'es

|-
| 2005
| Punchi Rala 
| Best Actress
|  
|-
| 2006
| Jeewithayata Idadenna 
| Best Actress
| 
|-
| 2007
| Sulan Seenu 
| Best Director - Single Episode
| 
|-
| 2008
| Rala Bindena Thena 
| Best Actress
| 
|-
| 2011
| Thaksalawa 
| Best Supporting Actress
| 
|-
| 2015
| Chess 
| Best Actress
| 
|-
| 2017
| One Way 
| Best Supporting Actress
| 
|-
| 2019
| Sahodaraya 
| Best Actress
| 
|}

Sumathi Awards

|-
| 1996
| Kasthirama 
| Best Actress
| 
|-
| 1996
| Sankranthi Samaya
| Popular Actress
| 
|-
| 1999
| Nisala Wila 
| Best Actress
| 
|-
| 2007
| Sulan Seenu 
| Best Director - Single Episode
| 
|-
| 2008
| Rala Bindena Thena 
| Best Actress
| 
|-
| 2011
| Thaksalawa 
| Best Supporting Actress
| 
|-
| 2021
| Weera Gedara Ewith 
| Best Supporting Actress
| 
|}

SIGNIS Awards

 
|-
| 2006
| Theth saha Viyali 
| Best Actress
| 
|-
| 2008
| Karuwala Gedara 
| Best Actress
| 
|-
| 2009
| Arungal 
| Best Actress
| 
|-
| 2015
| Chess 
| Best Actress
| 
|-
| 2018
| Bedde Kulawamiya 
| Best Supporting Actress
| 
|}

References

External links
Premiere for newest children’s play

1962 births
Living people
Sri Lankan television actresses